Dastgerdi (also Romanized as Dastgerdī; also known as Banāvach and Dastgerdī-ye Banāvach) is a village in Khaneh Shur Rural District, in the Central District of Salas-e Babajani County, Kermanshah Province, Iran. At the 2006 census, its population was 48 people, divided into 10 families.

References 

Populated places in Salas-e Babajani County